TS "Stan" Broderick (22 May 1893 – 4 April 1962)  was an Irish mathematician and academic who served as Erasmus Smith's Professor of Mathematics (1944-1962) at Trinity College Dublin (TCD).  He was father of Irish academic Edna Longley.

Life and career
Timothy Stanislaus Broderick was born in Youghal, Cork.  He studied mathematics at University College Cork (BA 1913, MA 1916) where he won a National University of Ireland Travelling Studentship Prize in 1916. He then went to TCD where he was a mathematics Scholar (1917) and got a BA in Mathematical and Experimental Physics (1918). After teaching for a few years in Exeter in England, he was appointed to the staff at TCD, serving as Donegall Lecturer (1926-1943) and then Erasmus Smith's Professor of Mathematics (1944-1962). In 1930 he became a Fellow of TCD, in 1958 a Senior Fellow, and in 1959 acting Vice Provost.

Selected papers
 Broderick, T. S.; Schrödinger, E. Boolean algebra and probability theory. Proc. Roy. Irish Acad. Sect. A 46, (1940). 103–112.
 Broderick, T. S.; On proving certain properties of the primes by means of the methods of pure number theory. Proc. Roy. Irish Acad. Sect. A 46, (1940). 17–24.
 Broderick, T. S.; On obtaining an estimate of the frequency of the primes by means of the elementary properties of the integers. J. London Math. Soc. 14 (1939). 303–310.

References

Alumni of Trinity College Dublin
Donegall Lecturers of Mathematics at Trinity College Dublin
Fellows of Trinity College Dublin
Scholars of Trinity College Dublin
20th-century Irish mathematicians
People from County Cork
1893 births
1962 deaths